The 2007 Speedway Grand Prix of Europe was the second race of the 2007 Speedway Grand Prix season.  It took place on 12 May in the Olympic Stadium in Wrocław, Poland.

Starting positions draw 
The Speedway Grand Prix Commission has nominated Sebastian Ułamek (as Wild Card), Tomasz Gapiński and Tomasz Jędrzejak (both as Track Reserve).

(15) Chris Harris (United Kingdom)
(2) Greg Hancock (United States)
(3) Nicki Pedersen (Denmark)
(16) Sebastian Ułamek (Poland)
(5) Leigh Adams (Australia)
(14) Rune Holta (Poland)
(9) Jarosław Hampel (Poland)
(6) Hans N. Andersen (Denmark)
(10) Antonio Lindbäck (Sweden)
(13) Wiesław Jaguś (Poland)
(8) Tomasz Gollob (Poland)
(12) Bjarne Pedersen (Denmark)
(1) Jason Crump (Australia)
(11) Scott Nicholls (United Kingdom)
(7) Matej Žagar (Slovenia)
(4) Andreas Jonsson (Sweden)
(17) Tomasz Gapiński (Poland)
(18) Tomasz Jędrzejak (Poland)

Jason Crump, Hans N. Andersen, Tomasz Gapiński and Tomasz Jędrzejak in 2007 season are Atlas Wrocław's rider.

Heat details

Heat after heat 
N.Pedersen, Hancock, Harris, Ułamek
Hampel, Adams, Holta, Andersen
B.Pedersen, Jaguś, Gollob, Lindbäck
Crump, Jonsson, Nicholls, Žagar
Adams, Crump, Harris, Lindbäck
Hancock, Jaguś, Nicholls, Holta (f)
Žagar, N.Pedersen, Gollob, Hampel (f)
Andersen, Jonsson, B.Pedersen, Ułamek
Harris, Holta, Jonsson, Gollob (e)
Hancock, Adams, Žagar, B.Pedersen
N.Pedersen, Nicholls, Andersen, Lindbäck
Ułamek, Crump, Hampel, Jaguś
Harris, B.Pedersen, Nicholls, Hampel (f)
Hancock, Crump, Gollob, Andersen
N.Pedersen, Jaguś, Jonsson (f/x), Adams (f/x)
Holta, Žagar, Ułamek, Lindbäck
Harris, Andersen, Žagar, Jaguś
Hancock, Hampel, Gapiński, Lindbäck (Gapiński replaced Jonsson who was not able to start)
N.Pedersen, Crump, B.Pedersen, Holta (f/x)
Adams, Ułamek, Nicholls, Gollob
Semi-Finals:
N.Pedersen, Crump, B.Pedersen, Žagar
Andersen, Harris, Hancock, Adams
Great Final:
N.Pedersen (6 points), Andersen (4 pts), Harris (2 pts), Crump

The intermediate classification

See also 
 List of Speedway Grand Prix riders

References 

E
2007
Sport in Wrocław
Speedway competitions in Poland
2007 in Polish speedway